Engineering Administration (EA) is a branch of engineering that is mainly concerned with the analysis and solution of operational and management problems using scientific and mathematical methods.
Engineering Administration is considered to be a subdiscipline of industrial engineering / systems engineering.

University programs

Undergraduate curriculum 
In the United States the undergraduate degree earned is the Bachelor of Science (B.S.) in Engineering Administration.

Postgraduate curriculum 
The postgraduate degree earned is the Master of Science in Engineering Administration (MEA).

Associations 
 INFORMS
 Institute of Industrial Engineers

See also
 Industrial Engineering
 Systems Engineering
 Enterprise Engineering
 Engineering Management
 Business Engineering

References

External links
Bachelor of Engineering Administration
Master of Engineering Administration (MEA)

Industrial engineering